The Iowa Arboretum is a nonprofit arboretum located in Madrid, Iowa that encompasses . The grounds are open daily from sunrise to sunset.

The arboretum was organized in 1966 by the Iowa State Horticultural Society on the society's 100th anniversary. Its mission is to grow, display, identify and study plants for education, research, conservation, aesthetics, and for personal enjoyment and recreation.

The arboretum contains hundreds of species of trees, shrubs, and flowers arranged in collections spanning  as follows: Butterfly Garden, Children's Garden, Columnar Trees, Conifers, Dwarf Garden, Flowering Trees, Founders Grove, Herbs, Hostas, Large Deciduous Trees, Medium Deciduous Trees, Nut Trees, Perennials, Shade Garden, Shrubs, Trees for Poorly Drained Soils, Windbreak, Viburnnums, and Irises.

See also 
 List of botanical gardens in the United States

External links
 Iowa Arboretum website

Arboreta in Iowa
Botanical gardens in Iowa
Protected areas of Boone County, Iowa
1966 establishments in Iowa